Michal Macek (born 19 January 1981) is a Czech footballer currently playing for Vlašim, on loan from 1. FK Příbram.

Macek has represented his country at every level up to and including Under 21. At that level he scored in his only appearance. Also represented his country at the 2001 FIFA World Youth Championship.

He joined St. Patrick's Athletic in July 2007 from Czech 1st Division club FK SIAD Most and has also had spells with FK Marila Příbram and FK Drnovice.

References

External links

1981 births
Living people
Czech footballers
Czech Republic youth international footballers
Czech Republic under-21 international footballers
St Patrick's Athletic F.C. players
League of Ireland players
Czech expatriate footballers
Czech First League players
FK Drnovice players
FK Baník Most players
1. FK Příbram players
MFK Karviná players
FK Čáslav players
FC Sellier & Bellot Vlašim players
Association football forwards
FC Oberlausitz Neugersdorf players
Expatriate association footballers in the Republic of Ireland
Sportspeople from Příbram